Daniel Moloney is an English professional wrestler currently working for various of the British independent scene promotions such as Progress Wrestling and Revolution Pro Wrestling.

Professional wrestling career (2013-present)

Progress Wrestling (2018-present)
Moloney mde his debut in Progress Wrestling at PROGRESS Chapter 80: Gods And Monsters on December 8, 2018, where he unsuccessfully challenged Trent Seven for the Progress Atlas Championship. He competed in various event gimmicks, such as at PROGRESS Chapter 89: 26th May 1988, a comedic event which took place on May 26, 2019, where he wrestled under the name of "The Teflon Sheik" and fell short to Mark Davis who portraited "Wally Handford". At PROGRESS Chapter 90 on June 30, 2019, Moloney teamed up with Trent Seven in a losing effort against Latin American Xchange (Santana and Ortiz). At PROGRESS Chapter 95: Still Chasing on September 15, 2019, Moloney took part into a rumble match to determine the inaugural Progress Proteus Championship, bout won by Paul Robinson which also involved various wrestlers such as Chris Brookes, Ilja Dragunov, Travis Banks, Eddie Kingston, Millie McKenzie, Jonathan Gresham and many others. At PROGRESS Chapter 104 on February 20, 2021, he unsuccessfully challenged Cara Noir for the PROGRESS World Championship. Moloney won his first title on Progress Wrestling, the PROGRESS Tag Team Championship alongside his "The 0121" tag team partner Man Like DeReiss at PROGRESS Chapter 131: 10th Anniversary Show on March 25, 2022, by defeating the previous champions Smokin' Aces (Charlie Sterling and Nick Riley) in a five-way tag team match also involving  Lykos Gym (Kid Lykos and Kid Lykos II), Sunshine Machine (Chuck Mambo and TK Cooper), and North West Strong (Chris Ridgeway and Luke Jacobs).

Revolution Pro Wrestling (2019-present)
Moloney made his first appearance for the promotion at RevPro Live At The Cockpit 43 on July 7, 2019, where he teamed up with MK McKinnan to defeat Dan Magee and Kurtis Chapman. At RevPro High Stakes 2021 on September 19, Moloney unsuccessfully faced Shota Umino. At RevPro Lethal Weapon on March 8, 2020, Moloney teamed up with Robbie X, falling short to Bullet Club's El Phantasmo and Hikuleo.

WWE (2017-2021)
Moloney made his debut in WWE on the NXT UK brand, while taking part in the inaugural United Kingdom Championship Tournament. He wrestled his first match on the first night of the tournament from January 14, 2017, where he fell short to Mark Andrews in the first rounds. On the second night of the tournament from January 15, Moloney teamed up with Nathan Cruz in a losing effort against Saxon Huxley and Tucker. He continued to make sporadic appearances on NXT UK, competing in various live shows such as the WWE United Kingdom Championship Special show from May 7, 2017, where he teamed up with Rich Swann in a losing effort against The Brian Kendrick and TJP. Moloney often teamed up with his indie tag team partner Man Like DeReiss in various events of the brand, such as the NXT UK #83 episode from March 6, 2020, where they fell short to Pretty Deadly (Lewis Howley and Sam Stoker).

Other media

Television
In 2022, Moloney played the role of Si in the British sitcom "Deep Heat", broadcast on ITV2 where he worked with comedy actress Pippa Haywood and "Sex Education" actor Alistair Petrie. Moloney said he struggled with scripts due to him suffering from dyslexia.

Championships and accomplishments
Attack! Pro Wrestling
Attack! 24:7 Championship (1 time)
Attack! Tag Team Championship (3 times) – with Man Like DeReiss (2) and Elephant Mask (1)
Fight Club: PRO
FCP Championship (1 time)
FCP Tag Team Championship (1 time) – with Man Like DeReiss
Kamikaze Pro
Kamikaze Pro Relentless Championship (1 time)
Kamikaze Pro Tag Team Championship (1 time) – with Tyler Bate
Pro Wrestling Illustrated
Ranked No. 391 of the top 500 singles wrestlers in the PWI Men's 500 in 2020
Progress Wrestling
PROGRESS Tag Team Championship (1 time) – with Man Like DeReiss
Revolution Pro Wrestling
Southside Heavyweight Championship (1 time)
TNT Extreme Wrestling
TNT World Championship (1 time, current)
Wrestling For
Wrestling For Championship (1 time, current)

References

1997 births
Living people
English male professional wrestlers
Sportspeople from Birmingham, West Midlands
PROGRESS Tag Team Champions